Nong Khayang is a district (amphoe) of Uthai Thani province, northern Thailand.

History
Nong Luang (หนองหลวง) was an important border checkpoint since the Ayutthaya Era. In 1917 when the government changed the district status khwaeng to  amphoe as in other provinces, Nong Luang was a district of Uthai Thani Province. The following year the district office of Nong Luang was moved to Noen Po and the district renamed Nong Khayang.

Geography
Neighboring districts are (from the west clockwise) Nong Chang, Thap Than, and Mueang Uthai Thani of Uthai Thani Province; Wat Sing and Nong Mamong of Chai Nat province.

Administration
The district is divided into nine sub-districts (tambons), which are further subdivided into 53 villages (mubans). Nong Khayang is a township (thesaban tambon) which covers parts of tambon Nong Khayang. There are a further five tambon administrative organizations (TAO).

References

External links
 Nong Khayang district history(Thai)

Nong Khayang